This List of places in Argyll and Bute is a list of links for any town, village, hamlet, castle, golf course, historic house, lighthouse, nature reserve, reservoir, river, canal, and other place of interest in the Argyll and Bute council area of Scotland.

A
Achahoish
Achanduin, Achanduin Castle
Achinhoan
Airdeny
Aldlochlay
Aldochlay
Appin
Ardbeg, Bute
Ardbeg, Islay
Arden
Ardencaple Castle
Ardentinny
Ardfern
Ardgartan
Ardkinglas Railway
Ardlui, Ardlui railway station
Ardmay
Ardpeaton
Ardrishaig
Arduaine
Argyll Forest Park, Argyll Mountains
Arinagour
Arrochar, Arrochar Alps, Arrochar and Tarbet railway station
Ascrib Islands

B
Barcaldine, Barcaldine Castle
Beinn Dorain
Bellochantuy
Ben Cruachan
Ben Donich
Benderloch
Benmore, Benmore Botanic Garden
Bernice
Blairglas
Bonawe
Bowmore
Breachacha Castle
Burnt Islands
Bute
Butterbridge

C
Cairnbaan
Cairndow
Cara Island
Cardross, Cardross railway station
Carnasserie Castle
Carradale
Carrick Castle
Campbeltown, Campbeltown Airport, Campbeltown and Machrihanish Light Railway
Castle Lachlan (aka New Castle Lachlan)
Castle Lachlan (aka Old Castle Lachlan)
Castle Stalker
Castle Sween
Castle Toward
Clachan Bridge
Clachan of Glendaruel
Cladich
Clynder
Coeffin Castle
Colintraive
Coll, Coll Airport
Colonsay, Colonsay Airport
Connel, Connel Ferry railway station
Corra Loch
Coulport, RNAD Coulport
Cove
Cowal
Craigendoran
Craighouse
Craighoyle
Craignish
Craignure
Craobh Haven
Crarae
Crinan, Crinan Canal

D
Dalavich
Dalmally, Dalmally railway station
Island Davaar
Druimdrishaig
Drumlemble
Duchlage
Dunbeg
Dunoon
Dunstaffnage Castle
Duntrune Castle
Duror

E
Eckford House
Edentaggart
Eilean Dubh

F
Faslane, Faslane Castle
Fincharn Castle
Fingal's Cave
Firth of Clyde
Firth of Lorne
Fladda, Slate Islands
Fladda, Treshnish Isles
Ford
Furnace

G
Gare Loch
Garelochhead
Geal Loch
Geilston
Gigha
Glen Fruin
Glenbarr
Glendaruel
Glenfinnart
Glenlean
Glensluan
Glunimore Island
Gometra
Gulf of Corryvreckan
Gunna

H
Helensburgh
Hill House
HMNB Clyde, HMS Vanguard, HMS Vengeance, HMS Victorious, HMS Vigilant 
Holy Loch

I
Inchmarnock
Innellan
Inveraray
Inverbeg
Invergroin
Inveruglas
Iona
Islay, Islay Airport

J
Jura

K

Kames
Keillmore
Keills Chapel
Kerrera
Kilberry
Kilbride
Kilchenzie
Kilchurn Castle
Kilcreggan
Kilmartin, Kilmartin Glen
Kilmelford
Kilmodan
Kilmore
Kilmory, Knapdale
Kilmory Castle, Kilmory Knap Chapel
Kilmun
Kilninver
Kintyre
Knapdale, Knapdale Forest
Kyles of Bute

L
Lagavulin, Lagavulin Distillery
Lismore
Loch Awe
Loch Creran
Loch Eck
Loch Etive
Loch Fyne
Loch Gilp
Loch Goil
Loch Linnhe
Loch Lomond, Loch Lomond and The Trossachs National Park
Loch Long
Loch Restil
Loch Sween
Loch Tarsan 
Lochgair
Lochgilphead
Lochgoilhead
Luing
Lunga, Firth of Lorn
Lunga, Treshnish Isles
Luss

M
Machrihanish
Millhouse
Minard
Mount Stuart House
Muasdale
Mull
Mull of Kintyre

O
Oban, Oban Airport
Ormsary
Otter Ferry

P
Peninver
Porincaple
Port Askaig
Port Bannatyne
Port Charlotte
Port Ellen
Portavadie
Portincaple
Portkil
Portnahaven

R
Rahane
Rest & Be Thankful
Rhu
Rhubodach
River Orchy
Rosneath, Rosneath Peninsula
Rothesay, Rothesay Castle

S
Saddell, Saddell Abbey, Saddell Castle
Sanda Island
Sandbank
Scarba
Seil
Shandon, Shandon Castle
Sheep Island
Shuna, Slate Islands
Shuna Island, Loch Linnhe
Skipness, Skipness Castle
Southend
St Michael's Chapel
Staffa
Stewarton
Strachur
Strone
Stuckgowan
Succoth

T
Tarbert, Jura
Tarbert, Kintyre
Tarbet
Tayinloan
Taynuilt
Tayvallich
Texa
Tighnabruaich
Tiree, Tiree Airport
Tobermory
Torinturk
Toward, Toward Lighthouse, Toward Point

U
Ulva

W
West Highland Line, West Highland Way
Whistlefield
Whitehouse

See also
List of places in Scotland
List of islands of Scotland

Argyll and Bute
Geography of Argyll and Bute
Lists of places in Scotland
Populated places in Scotland